Steven Grinspoon (M.D.) is a Professor of Medicine at Harvard Medical School, Chief of the Massachusetts General Hospital (MGH) Metabolism Unit, and Director of the Nutrition Obesity Research Center at Harvard. In addition, he is the MGH Endowed Chair in Neuroendocrinology and Metabolism. His work investigates the neuroendocrine regulation of body composition, and physiologic consequences of fat distribution on cardiovascular disease and inflammation. He has investigated the effects of reduced growth hormone on metabolic dysregulation in obesity and was the first to propose the use of a Growth Hormone-releasing Hormone (GHRH) analogue to increase endogenous GH secretion on lipodystrophy and generalized obesity, which led to the FDA approval of Tesamorelin for excess visceral fat accumulation in HIV-infected patients. This work has now been extended to show robust effects on Non-alcoholic fatty liver disease (NAFLD). More recently, his research focuses on the inflammatory mechanisms by which ectopic fat and other metabolic perturbations contribute to HIV-Cardiovascular disease (CVD), and in this regard, he led the AHA State of the Science Conference on CVD in HIV. Additionally, he is leading the large multicenter REPRIEVE study, the first study of a primary prevention strategy for CVD in HIV. He has also investigated increased Renin-Angiotensin-Aldosterone System (RAAS) activation and immune activation in relationship to visceral fat accumulation, and the mechanisms of subcutaneous adipose dysfunction involving DICER. Dr. Grinspoon has served on the Harvard faculty since 1995 and has been selected by the American Society for Clinical Investigation and the Association of American Physicians for his scientific contributions. He received the American Federation of Medical Research Investigator of the Year Award in 2005 and the Edward H. Ahrens Jr. Award for Patient Oriented Research in 2014 as well as the Endocrine Society Laureate Award for Translational Research in 2016. He has published over 330 articles and mentored over 40 trainees in his career. He was elected as a Member of the American Clinical and Climatological Association for his achievements in 2017. His work demonstrating the effects of Tesamorelin to reduce hepatic fat and fibrosis progression in NAFLD, published in Lancet HIV, was a finalist for the Clinical Research Forum’s top 10 Clinical Research Achievement Awards in 2020. In 2015, he became the Principal Investigator of the NIH funded Nutrition Obesity Research Center at Harvard.

Publications 
Grinspoon has published 265 original research articles, and over 50 review papers in his field. He has authored key Chapters in the Williams Textbook of Endocrinology and The Oxford textbook of Endocrinology on the endocrine manifestation of HIV/AIDS. He has served on the Weight Loss and Wasting Working Group Expert Panel on National HIV/AIDS to develop Nutrition Guidelines for the Department of Health and Human Services and developed guidelines for the Nutritional Assessment of HIV-infected Patients in work commissioned by the NIH and WHO. He has contributed to key guidelines on the prevention and management of cardiovascular disease in HIV, Chairing the AHA State of the Science Conference on CVD Risk in HIV in 2008, published in Circulation and the NIH sponsored symposium on the Review and Recognition of Obesity in HIV in 2017, published in Clinical Infectious Diseases. He has also participated in the writing group of guidelines for the International AIDS Society-USA Management of Metabolic Complications Associated with Antiretroviral Therapy for HIV-1 infection. He has served on the Advisory Boards of JCEM, JAIDS AIDS, and Nature Reviews Endocrinology, and the Journal of Clinical Investigation.

Education 
Grinspoon graduated Phi Beta Kappa, Magna Cum Laude as a College Scholar from Cornell University in 1983, attended the University of Rochester School of Medicine, graduating in 1988, and was awarded AOA Alumni Award from the medical school in 2006.  He did his Medical residency and Chief Residency at Columbia Presbyterian from 1988 to 1992 and his Endocrinology Fellowship at Massachusetts General Hospital from 1992 to 1995.

Research and awards 
Dr. Grinspoon’s primary research focus has been to investigate the effects of augmenting endogenous GH pulsatility on visceral fat in lipodystrophic patients with abdominal fat accumulation and nonalcoholic fatty liver disease. This work was initiated by an observation of reduced GH secretion in HIV patients with lipodystrophy. Subsequent studies examined the mechanisms and demonstrated reduced area under the curve per peak, but maintenance of the GH pulse generator in such patients. Reasoning that augmentation of GH pulsatility might reduce visceral fat, because of its potent effects to oxidize adipose tissue, Dr. Grinspoon led a series of studies culminating in a NEJM paper demonstrating that Tesamorelin, a GHRH1-44 secretagogue, reduced visceral fat by 20% and reduced triglyceride, while improving adiponectin. This work led to FDA approval of Tesamorelin as the only such approved drug for HIV lipodystrophy and first in class molecule. Subsequent studies, published in JAMA and Lancet HIV, demonstrated that Tesamorelin significantly reduced hepatic steatosis as well, the first drug to demonstrate a significant effect among patients with HIV lipodystrophy. Subsequent work demonstrated significant effects to stimulate hepatic oxidative pathways and reduce inflammatory pathways in gene set enrichment studies. Dr. Grinspoon was granted a US Patent entitled “GHRH or Analogues thereof for the Use in Treatment of Hepatic Disease” for this work. Tesamorelin was also investigated in generalized obesity and showed significant effects to reduce cIMT, inflammatory markers, lipids and visceral adiposity.

A second major and related focus of Dr. Grinspoon’s work has been to investigate the mechanisms and strategies for CVD in HIV.  In this regard, he led an AHA sponsored State of the Science Symposium on CVD in HIV. The conclusions from this conference called for a better understanding and treatment strategies of CVD in HIV. This work began with epidemiologic studies demonstrating increased myocardial infarction rates in HIV patients in the JCEM. This data was followed by a series of mechanistic studies demonstrating increased prevalence of plaque, particularly noncalcified, lipid rich, plaque. Dr. Grinspoon used FDG PET to demonstrate for the first time significant arterial inflammation in asymptomatic low traditional risk HIV patients, compared to Framingham risk matched control subjects, as well as non HIV patients with known CVD, published in JAMA. Of note, increased arterial inflammation was most significantly associated with increased markers of immune activation. He also recently proposed the first use of tilmanocept as a CD206 specific imaging agent for arterial inflammation, with significant success in HIV published in JID. This work was followed by studies in HIV patients in which he phenotyped the morphological characteristics of coronary plaque in HIV patients, demonstrating an increased prevalence of high risk plaque with low attenuation and positive remodeling, more vulnerable to rupture. His studies suggested that treatment with a statin might uniquely target both traditional risk factors including low-density lipoprotein (LDL) but also increased immune activation indices driving atypical noncalcified high risk plaque in this population. This work culminated in a recent paper in Lancet HIV, in which he showed for the first time that a statin can significantly reduce high risk plaque volume as well as improve the high-risk morphological features in coronary lesions in HIV. In recognition of this work, he has led the REPRIEVE trial, a global primary prevention study performed in 12 countries, since 2013 and gave the plenary lecture at CROI 2015 on this topic.

Finally, Dr. Grinspoon has worked to understand the mechanism, and treatment strategies for metabolic dysregulation in HIV, and was among the first to assess metformin and rosiglitazone to reverse insulin resistance and increase adipogenesis in this population. He also recognized reduced DICER as a factor that may contribute to dysfunctional adipose tissue in HIV.

Awards 
Dr. Grinspoon was elected to the American Society of Clinical Investigation (ASCI) in 2003 and the Honor Society for Humanism in Medicine for the Arnold P. Gold Foundation in 2004. He received the Outstanding Investigator Award from the American Federation for Medical Research in 2005 and was honored with the Pfizer Visiting Professorship at UC Davis in 2004, the Frank H. Tyler Honorary Endowed Lectureship at the University of Utah in 2008, the Dorothy M. Kahkonen Lectureship at the Henry Ford Health System in 2009, the Johnson Maguire Visiting Professorship at the University of Cincinnati in 2015 and the Michael O. Thorner Distinguished Lectureship in Endocrinology from the University of Virginia in 2019.  He was named the Alpha Omega Alpha Alumni of the year Awardee at the University of Rochester in 2006 and elected to the Association of American Physicians in 2011. In 2014, he received the Edward H. Ahrens Award for Patient Oriented Clinical Research from the Association of Clinical and Translational Science (ACTS) and the American Medical Federation for Medical Research (AMFAR). In 2016 He received the Gerald Aurbach Laureate Award for Outstanding Translational Research from the Endocrine Society. In 2017 he was elected to the American Clinical and Climatological Association. Dr. Grinspoon received an Albert Nelson Lifetime Achievement Award from Who’s Who in America in 2017 and his research on the use of Tesamorelin for fatty liver disease in the Lancet HIV was named as a finalist to the Top 10 Clinical Research Achievement Awards in 2020.

Press releases 
 MGH Press Release: Effects of Tesamorelin on Nonalcoholic Fatty liver Disease in HIV: A Randomized, Double-Blind, Multicenter Trial. Lancet HIV 2019.
 NIH Pres Release: MGH Press Release re Effects of Tesamorelin on Nonalcoholic Fatty liver Disease in HIV: A Randomized, Double-Blind, Multicenter Trial. Lancet HIV 2019. https://www.niaid.nih.gov/news-events/drug-reverses-signs-liver-disease-people-living-hiv
 MGH Press Release: Association of In Utero HIV exposure with Obesity and Reactive Airway Disease in HIV-Negative Adolescents and Young Adults. JAIDS 2019.
 Podcast: Effects of Tesamorelin on Nonalcoholic Fatty liver Disease in HIV: A Randomized, Double-Blind, Multicenter Trial. Lancet HIV 2019.
 MGH Press release: Initial data from the landmark REPRIEVE study on HIV and heart disease highlights the multiple health risks among a population that’s living longer.

Key discoveries 
 Efficacy of Tesamorelin to reduce visceral adiposity 2007 (NEJM)
 Efficacy of Tesamorelin to reduce liver fat 2014 (JAMA)
 Efficacy of Tesamorelin to prevent liver fibrosis progression in 2019 (Lancet HIV)
 Demonstration of Tesamorelin effects on key hepatic metabolic pathways in 2020 (JCI Insight)
 Demonstration of increased arterial inflammation in HIV in 2012 (JAMA)
 Identification of key genes and proteins leading to dysfunctional subcutaneous adipose tissue in HIV Lipodystrophy 2021 (JCI Insight)
 First use of macrophage specific imaging agent to identify plaque cardiovascular imaging (JID 2021)

Board memberships 

 Scientific Advisory Board, Marathon Asset Management
 Scientific Advisor, Theratechnologies
 Arnold Gold Foundation for Humanism in Medicine (2002-2004)
Massachusetts General Hospital Executive Committee on Research (2016-2018) 
 Harvard Hillel (2019-Present)
 American Jewish Committee New England (2020-Present)
University of Rochester (2021-Present)

References

External links 
 MGH Metabolism Unit Website
REPRIEVE Trial Website
Nutrition Obesity Research Center at Harvard Website

Year of birth missing (living people)
Living people